Eslamabad (also Romanized as Eslāmābād; also known as Ashrafābād) is a village in Azimiyeh Rural District, in the Central District of Ray County, Tehran Province, Iran. At the 2006 census, its population was 10,763, in 2,350 families.

References 

Populated places in Ray County, Iran